Ooh La La is a 2003 Indian Kannada-language romance film written, directed and produced by Hemanth Hedge, making his debut. It features Krishna Mohan  and Radhika along with Sonia Agarwal in the lead roles. The score and soundtrack for the film is by Suresh Devkumar. The film was a box office success.

Cast 
 Krishna Mohan
 Radhika
 Sonia Agarwal

Production 
The film was shot for around 45 days in Bangalore, Vizag and Mysore.

Soundtrack 
The film's background score and the soundtrack were composed by Suresh Devkumar. The music rights were acquired by Ananda Audio.

Release 
The film was initially scheduled to release on 25 December 2002.

References 

2000s Kannada-language films
2000s romance films
Indian romance films